The 1961 Toledo Rockets football team was an American football team that represented Toledo University in the Mid-American Conference (MAC) during the 1961 NCAA University Division football season. In their second season under head coach Clive Rush, the Rockets compiled a 3–7 record (2–4 against MAC opponents) and finished in fifth place in the MAC.

The team's statistical leaders included Phil Yenrick with 563 passing yards, Frank Baker with 739 rushing yards, and Pete Jollif with 330 receiving yards.

Schedule

References

Toledo
Toledo Rockets football seasons
Toledo Rockets football